Il peccato e la vergogna is an Italian television series.

Cast
 Manuela Arcuri: Carmen Tabacchi Fontamara (seasons 1-2)
 Marisa Berenson: Elena Fontamara (episode 1-3)
 Gabriel Garko: Nito Valdi (seasons 1-2)
 Francesco Testi: Giancarlo Fontamara (seasons 1-2)
 Victoria Larchenko: Elisa Fontamara (episode 1-5)
 Stefano Santospago: Francesco Fontamara (season 1)
 Eros Galbiati: Giulio Fontamara (episode 1-3)
 Giuliana De Sio: Bigiù (episode 1-5)
 Rosa Pianeta: Mina Tabacchi (seasons 1-2)
 Martine Brochard: Sylvie (season 1-2)
 Massimo Venturiello: Dilmo Duranti (season 1)
 Eva Grimaldi: Liliana (episode 4-5)
 Valeria Milillo: Piera (episode 3-6)
 Bruno Eyron: colonnello Kruger (episode 5)
 Laura Torrisi: Ortensia Pizzo (episode 6)
 Luka Tartaglia: Otello
 Rosalinda Celentano: Maria Pia Torricelli (episode 6)
 Alfredo Pea: Professor Gilsenti (episode 1-3)
 Isa Gallinelli: Meraviglia (episode 1-5)
 Adriana Russo: Teresina (episode 1-5)
 Giovanni Scifoni: Tony (episode 1)
 Pierpaolo Lovino: Commissario del Buono (episode 1-2)
 Massimo Corvo: Il Bisonte (episode 1)
 Valeria Flore: Contessina Arabella Casati (episode 1-4)
 Emilio Bonucci: Guido Tabacchi (episode 1-2)
 Giancosimo Pagliara: Gesualdo Griffi (episode 6)
 Aldo Bergamaschi: Enisio Pizzo (episode 1-3)
 Vincenzo Messina: Ninetto (episode 1)

Soundtrack
These are the songs of Savio Riccardi used in the episodes:

Il Peccato E La Vergogna
 Il Peccato E La Vergogna
 Carmen
 Tema Dell'Abbandono
 Vento Di Guerra

Il Peccato E La Vergogna 2
 Incancellabili ricordi
 Momenti sereni
 Disperazione assoluta
 Trenodia
 Elsa
 Eterna minaccia

See also
List of Italian television series

References

External links
 
Il peccato e la vergogna - Parte seconda on IMDb

Italian television series
2010 Italian television series debuts
Canale 5 original programming